The Second Battle of the Somme of 1918 was fought during the First World War on the Western Front from late August to early September, in the basin of the River Somme. It was part of a series of successful counter-offensives in response to the German Spring Offensive, after a pause for redeployment and supply.

The most significant feature of the two 1918 Somme battles was that with the failure of  the first 1918 Somme Battle  (not to be  confused with the   1916 Battle of the Somme) having halted what had begun as a large German offensive, the second formed the central part of the Allies' advance to the Armistice of 11 November.

Battle 
On August 15, British Field Marshal Douglas Haig refused demands from Supreme Allied Commander Marshal Ferdinand Foch to continue the Amiens offensive, as that attack was faltering as the troops outran their supplies and artillery, and German reserves were being moved to the sector. Instead, Haig began to plan for an offensive at Albert, which opened on 21 August. The main attack was launched by the British Third Army, with the United States II Corps attached.

The second battle began on 21 August with the opening of the Second Battle of Bapaume to the north of the river itself. That developed into an advance which pushed the German Second Army back over a 55 kilometre front, from south of Douai to La Fère, south of Saint-Quentin, Aisne. Albert was captured on 22 August. On 26 August, the British First Army widened the attack by another twelve kilometres, sometimes called the Second Battle of Arras. Bapaume fell on 29 August. The Australian Corps crossed the Somme River on the night of 31 August, and broke the German lines at the Battle of Mont St. Quentin and the Battle of Péronne. The British Fourth Army's commander, General Henry Rawlinson, described the Australian advances of 31 August – 4 September as the greatest military achievement of the war.

On the morning of 2 September, the Canadian Corps seized control of the Drocourt-Quéant line (representing the west edge of the Hindenburg Line). The battle was fought by the Canadian 1st Division, 4th Division, and by the British 52nd Division. Heavy German casualties were inflicted, and the Canadians also captured more than 6,000 unwounded prisoners. Canada's losses amounted to 5,600. By noon that day the German commander, Erich Ludendorff, had decided to withdraw behind the Canal du Nord.

By 3 September, the Germans had been forced back to the Hindenburg Line, from which they had launched their offensive in the spring.

On their way to the Hindenburg Line, in a fierce battle, the Canadian troops, led by General Sir Arthur Currie, overcame the earthworks of the incomplete Canal du Nord during the Battle of Canal du Nord.

In late September/early October, one of the epic battles of the whole war was the breach of the Hindenburg Line (the Battle of St. Quentin Canal) by British, Australian and American troops (under the command of Australian General John Monash). Soon after, the Canadians breached the Hindenburg Line at the Battle of Cambrai.

A key part of the German supply line ran parallel with the front. This second 1918 battle around the Somme was part of a strategy designed to push parts of the German line back behind this main supply line, cutting it and making impossible the efficient maintenance of the German forces on the front. The campaign began with battle of Bapaume and, starting shortly after, the Battle of Saint-Mihiel, outside the Somme area, with the aim of reducing salients before using the fluidity of the broken line to press on to the strategic railway. It was hoped that this fluidity would be present as, owing to the German advance in the spring, the German forces were well in advance of their hitherto impregnable, very well prepared defences on the Hindenburg Line.

This policy worked, but it took some very determined effort at the St. Quentin Canal, among the prepared defences, to achieve success.

See also 
 List of Canadian battles during World War I
 Hundred Days Offensive (1918)

References

Further reading

External links 
 Philpott, William: Battles of Somme in: 1914-1918-online. International Encyclopedia of the First World War.
 

1918 in France
Battles of the Western Front (World War I)
Battles of World War I involving Australia
Battles of World War I involving Canada
Battles of World War I involving Germany
Battles of World War I involving the United Kingdom
Battles of World War I involving the United States
Conflicts in 1918
August 1918 events
September 1918 events